Seevoor or Sevoor is a rural suburb of vellore city in the Indian state of Tamil Nadu.

Demographics
 India census, Sevur had a population of 8645. Males constitute 50% of the population and females 50%. Sevur has an average literacy rate of 52%, lower than the national average of 59.5%: male literacy is 62%, and female literacy is 42%. In Sevur, 14% of the population is under 6 years of age.

References

Cities and towns in Vellore district